Valenciennellus tripunctulatus, commonly called the constellationfish, is a species of fish in the family Sternoptychidae (hatchetfish).

Description

It darkens its body at night by pigment dispersion. It is silvery-white in colour with several black spots; the name tripunctulatus ("three-spotted") refers to the larger spots on their ventral surface, although there are often more than three of these.

Habitat

Valenciennellus tripunctulatus lives all the world's non-polar oceans.

Behaviour

Valenciennellus tripunctulatus is a selective daytime feeder on copepods (mainly Pleuromamma) and ostracods (such as Conchoecia).

It breeds year-round, with egg batches about 100–360 eggs per ovary pair, the number increasing with animal size. It does not guard its eggs.

References

Sternoptychidae
Fish described in 1871
Taxa named by Laurits Martin Esmark